Shorton may refer to:

 Robert Shorton, English churchman
 Shorton, Devon, a district of Paignton, Devon, England

See also
 Shorten